Erasmus Morgan Weaver Jr. (May 23, 1854 – November 13, 1920) was a United States Army major general who served as the first chief of the Militia Bureau and the Chief of the Army's Coast Artillery Corps.

Biography
The son of Erasmus M. Weaver, a prominent businessman of Lafayette, Indiana, Erasmus Morgan Weaver Jr. was born in Lafayette on May 23, 1854. He graduated from the United States Military Academy in 1875 and received his commission as a second lieutenant of Artillery.

Weaver's subsequent assignments included Professor of Military Science at Western Reserve University and The Citadel (1883–1885), and Instructor in Chemistry and Electricity at the United States Military Academy (1888–1891).

From 1895 to 1896 Weaver studied at the Massachusetts Institute of Technology.

In 1898 Weaver was appointed to the temporary grade of lieutenant colonel of the 5th Massachusetts Infantry, a volunteer regiment raised during the Spanish–American War. Initially the organization's mustering officer, he subsequently commanded its 1st Battalion.

From 1908 to 1911 Weaver served as head of the Army's Militia Bureau, the first person to hold the position. In this assignment he was responsible for overseeing the training and readiness of the National Guard.

Weaver was the Chief of the Coast Artillery Corps from 1911 until his retirement in 1918, when he was succeeded by Frank W. Coe. He was promoted to brigadier general in 1911 and major general in 1916.  From 1917 until his retirement he also served as a member of the War Council that the War Department created to oversee planning for World War I.

Weaver died in Washington, D.C., on November 13, 1920.  He is buried in Arlington National Cemetery, Section SE, Site 1800.

General Weaver was the father of Major General Walter Reed Weaver (1885–1944).

Hawaii's Fort Weaver and Fort Weaver Road were named for him.

References

Sources
 "General Weaver Retires", The New York Times, May 22, 1918

1854 births
1920 deaths
Military personnel from Indiana
United States Army Field Artillery Branch personnel
People from Lafayette, Indiana
People from Washington, D.C.
United States Military Academy alumni
United States Army Coast Artillery Corps personnel
Massachusetts Institute of Technology alumni
Chiefs of the National Guard Bureau
American military personnel of the Spanish–American War
United States Army generals of World War I
United States Army generals
Burials at Arlington National Cemetery